Gobio huanghensis is a species of gudgeon, a small freshwater in the family Cyprinidae. It is found in the middle and upper reaches of the Yangtze in China.

References
 

Gobio
Fish described in 1977
Freshwater fish of China